Park Eun-hye (born February 21, 1977) is a South Korean actress. She is best known for starring in Dae Jang Geum, which led to her popularity in China. She also played the lead role in the Taiwanese drama, Silence, starring Vic Chou, and directed by Zhang Zhong.

Career
Park Eun-hye entered the entertainment industry in 1998, but she only rose to fame in 2003 with a supporting role in hit MBC TV series Dae Jang Geum (also known as Jewel in the Palace), which enjoyed tremendous popularity throughout Asia.

After a secondary lead role in 18 vs. 29, she further solidified her status as a major Korean Wave star with the success of another period drama Yi San (2007) and her Taiwanese series Silence opposite heartthrob Vic Zhou (2006).

Park decided to star in Hong Sang-soo's 2008 art film Night and Day even without a salary, and her performance received a Best New Actress award from the prestigious Busan Film Critics Association, her first award in ten years of acting. The next year she returned to television playing a femme fatale in daily drama Pink Lipstick.

In 2012 she began co-hosting on cable the variety shows Queen of Beauty on KBS Drama, and Sold Out on tvN.

Park is more popular in China than in her native South Korea, as the sales of the Chinese brands she models for—Hana Cosmetics and Yonseng Tangerine Chocolates (the latter named after her character in Dae Jang Geum) -- went over 25 million dollars in the year 2009.

Personal life
Park Eun-hye married entrepreneur Kim Han-sup on April 27, 2008, at Shilla Hotel in Seoul. She gave birth to fraternal twin sons, Kim Jae-wan and Kim Jae-ho, in 2011. On September 14, 2018, it was reported that she finalized her divorce from her former husband earlier that same month, with the cause for the divorce being irreconcilable differences. Her agency later released a statement confirming that she had parted ways with her husband, and that she would be raising their children.

Filmography

Television series

Web series

Films

Television shows

Awards and nominations

References

External links 
 
 
 

South Korean television actresses
South Korean film actresses
People from Incheon
1978 births
Living people
Seoul Institute of the Arts alumni